The 2011 Sparta Prague Open was a professional tennis tournament played on clay courts. It was part of the 2011 ITF Women's Circuit, offering a total of $100,000 in prize money. It took place at the Tennis Club Sparta Prague in Bubeneč, Prague, Czech Republic, from 9 to 15 May 2011.

Singles entrants

Seeds 

 Rankings as of 2 May 2011

Other entrants 

The following players received wildcards into the singles main draw:
  Jana Čepelová
  Gesa Focke
  Kristýna Plíšková
  Martina Přádová

The following players received entry from the qualifying draw:
  Marta Domachowska
  Mariana Duque
  Aleksandra Krunić
  Ahsha Rolle

The following players received entry into the singles main draw as lucky losers:
  Denisa Allertová
  Katarzyna Piter

Finals

Singles 

  Magdaléna Rybáriková defeated  Petra Kvitová 6–3, 6–4

Doubles 

  Petra Cetkovská /  Michaëlla Krajicek defeated  Lindsay Lee-Waters /  Megan Moulton-Levy 6–2, 6–1

External links 
 
 2011 Sparta Prague Open at ITFtennis.com

2011 ITF Women's Circuit
2011
2011 in Czech tennis